Sayad may refer to:
 Sayyid, a title
 Sayad, Afghanistan
 Sayad, Hama, a Syrian village in Kafr Zita Nahiyah in Mhardeh District, Hama.
 Sayad, Azerbaijan, a village and municipality in the Khachmaz Rayon of Azerbaijan.